Odore Joseph Gendron (September 13, 1921 – October 16, 2020) was an American prelate of the Roman Catholic Church. He served as bishop of the Diocese of Manchester in New Hampshire from 1975 to 1990.

Biography

Early life 
Gendron was born on September 13, 1921, in Manchester, New Hampshire, to Franco-Americans Francis and Valida (née Rouleau) Gendron. He attended Sacred Heart School in Manchester and before continuing his education in Canada, where he studied at St. Charles Borromeo Seminary in Sherbrooke, Quebec. From 1942 to 1947, he studied philosophy and theology at St. Paul Seminary in Ottawa, Ontario.

Priesthood 
Gendron was ordained to the priesthood for the Diocese of Manchester by Bishop Matthew Brady on May 31, 1947.

Following his ordination, Gendron served as associate pastor at Angel Guardian Parish in Berlin, New Hampshire, until 1952, and then at Sacred Heart Parish in Lebanon, New Hampshire (1952–1960), and St. Louis Church in Nashua, New Hampshire (1960–1965). From 1965 to 1967, Gendron was pastor of Our Lady of Lourdes Parish in Pittsfield, New Hampshire. He then served at St. Augustin Parish in Manchester until 1972, when he was named the first episcopal vicar for women religious. Gendron was raised by the Vatican to the rank of honorary prelate  in December 1970, and became vicar for clergy in January 1974.

Bishop of Manchester 
On December 12, 1974, Gendron was appointed the seventh bishop of the Diocese of Manchester by Pope Paul VI. He received his episcopal consecration on February 3, 1975, from Bishop Ernest Primeau, with Bishops Edward O'Leary and Timothy Harrington serving as co-consecrators. 

Continuing the implementation of the Second Vatican Council's reforms begun under Bishop Primeau, Gendron established a permanent diaconate and joined the New Hampshire Council of Churches. He also established Magdalen College in Bedford, New Hampshire and Thomas More College of Liberal Arts in Merrimack, New Hampshire. Additionally, he served as honorary president of Notre Dame College in Manchester.

Retirement and legacy 
After fifteen years as bishop, Gendron submitted his letter of resignation to Pope Paul II on June 12, 1990. He was succeeded by Coadjutor Bishop Leo O'Neil. 

Court papers released in January 2003 showed that Gendron destroyed records of sexual abuse by two different priests during the 1980's.  The first instance was in 1986 for Philip Petit, a diocese priest who molested a teenager between 1979 and 1981.  Petit left the priesthood in 1986 and Gendron destroyed all of his treatment records at Petit's request.  The instance was in 1989, when the Servants of the Paraclete treatment facility in New Mexico requested that Gendron destroy the treatment records of Gordon MacRae, a diocese priest who had been treated at the facility.  In 1994, McRae was sentenced to 33 to 67 years in state prison for molesting children.

In a 2003 report by the New Hampshire Attorney General, it was revealed that Gendron helped a priest accused of sexual abuse avoid criminal charges.  In 1975, police in Nashua, New Hampshire arrested Paul Aube, a diocese priest, after find him with a boy in a car, both with their pants down.  Aube, who had confessed to acts of sexual abuse in 1972, confessed his guilt to Gendron.  He asked Gendron to send him for treatment and relieve him of parish duties.  Instead, Gendron called the Nashua police chief to drop charges against Aube.  Gendron then transferred Aube to a parish in Rochester, New Hampshire.  In 1981, the mother of a 15 year old boy discovered Aube having sex with him in the church rectory.  When advised of the new allegation, Gendron did not report Aube to the police.  In 2002, Aube turned himself into state authorities and became a cooperating witness.

Odore Gendron died on October 16, 2020, at age 99. At the time of his death, he was the oldest living Catholic bishop in the United States.

See also
 

 Catholic Church hierarchy
 Catholic Church in the United States
 Historical list of the Catholic bishops of the United States
 List of Catholic bishops of the United States
 Lists of patriarchs, archbishops, and bishops

References

External links
 Roman Catholic Diocese of Manchester Official Site

Episcopal succession

1921 births
2020 deaths
20th-century Roman Catholic bishops in the United States
21st-century Roman Catholic bishops in the United States
American people of French-Canadian descent
People from Manchester, New Hampshire
Roman Catholic bishops of Manchester
Religious leaders from New Hampshire